Labasa Airport  is an airport serving Labasa (pronounced ) is a town located in Macuata Province, in the northeastern part of the island of Vanua Levu in Fiji. It is operated by Airports Fiji Limited.

Facilities

Airlines and destinations

References

External links
 
 

Airports in Fiji
Macuata Province
Vanua Levu